Hi-School Pharmacy Inc. is a chain of drugstores, hardware stores and combination drugstore/hardware stores based in Vancouver, Washington, USA.

History
Edith and Ira Nelson started High School Store in 1925 in downtown Vancouver, Washington, right across the street from Vancouver High School on Main Street.
Brothers Ken and Matt Zapp bought out the Nelsons and renamed the store Hi-School Pharmacy in 1939.
The Zapps sold the Hi-School Pharmacy to Val Mowan in 1948.
Mowan sold Hi-School Pharmacy to Steve and Jan Oliva in 1967.
The Olivas sold 16 Hi-School Pharmacies to Walgreens, including the original pharmacy location in downtown Vancouver, in 2003.  The Olivas retained space at the original location for a Hi-School Ace Hardware store.

References

External links
 Hi-School Pharmacy Official website

Pharmacies of the United States
American companies established in 1925
Retail companies established in 1925
Hardware stores of the United States
Companies based in Vancouver, Washington
Health care companies based in Washington (state)
1925 establishments in Washington (state)